John Graham Nicholls FRS is a British/Swiss physiologist.

Life 
Nicholls is professor emeritus of physiology. He was educated at Berkhamsted School and King's College London. He received his M.D. from Charing Cross Hospital and a Ph.D. from the Department of Biophysics at University College London in 1955. He worked at University College London, and the universities of Oxford, Harvard, Yale, and Stanford. In 1983 he became professor of pharmacology at the Biozentrum University of Basel. Since reaching emeritus status in 1998, he has been professor of neurobiology at the International School for Advanced Studies. The International Brain Research Organization has named a fellowship in his honor and he is a Fellow of the Royal Society.

Work 
Nicholls is best known for his research in the field of neurobiology. In invertebrate and mammalian nervous systems he studied synaptic transmission as well as the problem of why neurons in the brain and spinal cord fail to regenerate after injury. For his studies he developed a new type of mammalian central nervous system (CNS) preparation which allowed the investigation of mechanisms involved in neurite outgrowth and CNS regeneration. In recent years he has started to study how the rhythm of respiration is generated by the nervous system. Additionally, he authored the book From Neuron to Brain, which is already in its fifth edition.

Awards & honors 
 1988 Fellow of the Royal Society
 2003 John Nicholls Fellowship
 2007 D.Sc. Honoris Causa, University of Trieste
 2010 Society for Neuroscience Award for Education in Neuroscience
 2011 Endowed John G. Nicholls Lecture

Books 
Kuffler S., Nicholls JG. From neuron to brain. Sinauer Associates Inc.,U.S.; 1st edition (August 12, 1976)
Kuffler S., Nicholls JG. From neuron to brain. Sinauer Associates Inc.,U.S.; 2nd edition (May 1, 1984)
Nicholls JG., Martin R. From neuron to brain. Sinauer Associates Inc; 3rd edition (September 1992)
Nicholls JG., Martin R. From neuron to brain. Sinauer Associates; 4th edition (January 15, 2001)
Nicholls JG., Martin R. From neuron to brain. Sinauer Associates is an imprint of Oxford University Press; 5 edition (November 7, 2011)

References

External links 
Prof. Dr. John Nicholls, Emeritus, Biozentrum University of Basel

Living people
People educated at Berkhamsted School
Alumni of King's College London
Alumni of University College London
Academics of the University of Oxford
Harvard University faculty
Yale University faculty
Stanford University faculty
Biozentrum University of Basel
Academics of University College London
Fellows of the Royal Society
1929 births
English biophysicists